Romeo y Julieta cigarettes is a Cuban brand of cigarettes, currently owned by the Franco-Spanish company Altadis, a subsidiary of Imperial Tobacco and manufactured by Habanos SA and BrasCuba. The brand is named after the tragic love story of Romeo and Juliet.

History
The brand was launched in 1999, where it is currently made.

Romeo y Julieta cigarettes are mainly sold in Cuba, but are or were sold in Spain, Germany, Austria, Switzerland, Mexico Moldova and Russia. Made of the same tobacco as their older cigar namesakes, Romeo y Julieta cigarettes are notable for their very strong flavour. They are made of dark tobaco, like galoises

See also

 Tobacco smoking
 Cohiba cigarettes

References

External links
 Romeo y Julieta on Habanos.com

Altadis brands